Rana Muhammad Tajammal Hussain (1 January 1966 - 23 February 2019) was a Pakistani politician who was a Member of the Provincial Assembly of the Punjab, from 2002 to May 2018.

Early life and education
He was born on 1 January 1966 in Lahore.

He graduated from University of the Punjab in 1985 and has the degree of Bachelor of Arts.

Political career
He was elected to the Provincial Assembly of the Punjab as a candidate of Pakistan Muslim League (N) (PML-N) from Constituency PP-157 (Lahore-XXI) in 2002 Pakistani general election. He received 14,356 votes and defeated a candidate of Pakistan Muslim League (Q).

He was re-elected to the Provincial Assembly of the Punjab as a candidate of PML-N from Constituency PP-157 (Lahore-XXI) in 2008 Pakistani general election. He received 27,318 votes and defeated a candidate of Pakistan Peoples Party. From 2008 to 2013, he served as Parliamentary Secretary for Industries.

He was re-elected to the Provincial Assembly of the Punjab as a candidate of PML-N from Constituency PP-157 (Lahore-XXI) in 2013 Pakistani general election.

He died on 23 February 2019 due to heart attack.

References

Punjab MPAs 2013–2018
Punjab MPAs 2002–2007
Punjab MPAs 2008–2013
1966 births
Pakistan Muslim League (N) politicians
2019 deaths